Kanticha Chumma, , nicknamed Ticha, is a Thai actress and model. She was born in Nakhon Si Thammarat Province but grew up in Sweden until she moved back to Phuket when she was 13, where she attended Satree Phuket School.

She became famous in the entertainment industry by winning a modeling competition named The Face Thailand in 2016.

The Face Thailand 
After hearing about the recruitment of The Face Thailand, she returned to Thailand 3 days before the application date to enter the contest. She joined Namthip Jongrachatawiboon's team and won the season 2 in 2016. In an interview, she revealed that she does not fit the stereotype that would fit in Thailand's beauty industry, but she has grown resilient against negative criticism from an early age.

Filmography 
Following her debut in The Face Thailand, she starred in the TV series Soot Ruk Chun La Moon from 2016 to 2017 and in Strange Girl in a Strange Land in 2019.

TV Dramas

TV Series

TV Sitcom

Music VDO

Master of Ceremony: MC ON TV

References

External links
 
 

Kanticha Chumma
Living people
1992 births
Kanticha Chumma
Kanticha Chumma
Kanticha Chumma
Kanticha Chumma
Kanticha Chumma
Kanticha Chumma
Kanticha Chumma
Kanticha Chumma